David Sims (born October 20, 1986) is a former American football safety. He was signed by the New York Giants as an undrafted free agent in 2011. He played college football for Iowa State University.

He has also been a member of the Cleveland Browns, Philadelphia Eagles, Indianapolis Colts and Toronto Argonauts.

Professional career
Sims was signed by the New York Giants as an undrafted free agent on July 28, 2011. He was released prior to the start of the regular season.

He was signed by Tampa Bay as a free agent on November 1, but was released three days later.

He then signed with the Cleveland Browns practice squad on November 29 where he remained for the rest of the season.

Philadelphia Eagles
The Philadelphia Eagles trades a conditional draft pick to the Browns for Sims on August 31, 2012.

Indianapolis Colts
On February 10, 2014, Sims signed with the Indianapolis Colts. The Colts released Sims on August 25, 2014.

Toronto Argonauts
On December 5, 2014, Sims signed with the Toronto Argonauts of the Canadian Football League. He was released by the Argonauts on May 12, 2015.

References

External links
Iowa State Cyclones bio
Philadelphia Eagles bio
Indianapolis Colts bio
Toronto Argonauts bio

1986 births
Living people
Sportspeople from Gainesville, Florida
Players of American football from Gainesville, Florida
American football safeties
Canadian football defensive backs
American players of Canadian football
Butte Roadrunners football players
Iowa State Cyclones football players
New York Giants players
Cleveland Browns players
Philadelphia Eagles players
Indianapolis Colts players
Toronto Argonauts players